Vugar Mursal Alakbarov (born 5 January 1981) is an Azerbaijani boxer.

Alakbarov competed in the middleweight class (−75 kg) at the 2000 Summer Olympics and won the bronze medal. At the 2004 Summer Olympics he was eliminated in the quarter final in the heavyweight class. He qualified for the 2004 Summer Olympics by ending up in first place at the 2nd AIBA European 2004 Olympic Qualifying Tournament in Warsaw, Poland.

Olympic results 
2000 (Middleweight)
Defeated Peter Kariuki Ngumi (Kenya) 12–3
Defeated Paul Miller (Australia) 9–8
Defeated Akin Kuloglu (Turkey) 18–8
Lost to Jorge Gutiérrez (Cuba) 9–19

2004 (Heavyweight)
Defeated Spyridon Kladouchas (Greece) 18–14
Lost to Naser Al Shami (Syria) DQ 4 (1:40)

References

1981 births
Living people
Azerbaijani male boxers
Boxers at the 2000 Summer Olympics
Boxers at the 2004 Summer Olympics
Olympic boxers of Azerbaijan
Olympic bronze medalists for Azerbaijan
Olympic medalists in boxing
Medalists at the 2000 Summer Olympics
Middleweight boxers